Mary Lubawski (born April 15, 1965) is a former breaststroke swimmer who represented Canada at the 1984 Summer Olympics in Los Angeles, California.  Lubawski advanced to the B Final of the 200-metre breaststroke, and finished in 12th place overall.

Mary Lubawski married Rick Hoyt and became Mary Hoyt on August 6th, 1988.

See also
 List of University of Georgia people

References

1965 births
Living people
Canadian female breaststroke swimmers
Georgia Bulldogs women's swimmers
Olympic swimmers of Canada
Swimmers from Toronto
Swimmers at the 1984 Summer Olympics
20th-century Canadian women
21st-century Canadian women